This is a list of player transfers involving Top 14 teams before or during the 2022–23 season. The list is of deals that are confirmed and are either from or to a rugby union team in the Top 14 during the 2021–22 season. It is not unknown for confirmed deals to be cancelled at a later date.

Bayonne

Players In
 Pierre Huguet from  Carcassonne 
 Mikheil Nariashvili from  Montpellier 
 Maxime Machenaud from  Racing 92 
 Thomas Acquier from  Brive
 Bastien Pourailly from  Clermont
 Thomas Ceyte from  Nevers 
 Camille Lopez from  Clermont
 Quentin Bethune from  Stade Français
 Manuel Leindekar from  Oyonnax 
 Pascal Cotet from  Narbonne 
 Jason Robertson from  Narbonne
 Facundo Bosch from  La Rochelle
 Kaminieli Rasaku from  Fiji Sevens 
 Eneriko Buliruarua from  La Rochelle 
 Mateaki Kafatolu from  Castres
 Pieter Scholtz from  Wasps
 Geoff Cridge from  NSW Waratahs
 Olajuwon Noah from  Sharks 
 Martín Bogado from  Jaguares XV 
 Luke Morahan from  Bristol Bears 
 Marland Yarde from  Sale Sharks

Players Out
 Ugo Boniface to  Bordeaux 
 Asier Usarraga to  Castres
 Filimo Taofifenua to  Oyonnax 
 Jean Baptiste de Clercq to  Bourg-en-Bresse 
 Maxime Lafage to  Vannes 
 Theo Costosseque to  Vannes 
 Luc Mousset retired 
 John Ulugia retired 
 Shaun Venter to  Montauban
 Maxime Delonca to  Dax
 Mariano Galarza retired
 Guillaume Douche to  Dax 
 Joe Ravouvou to  Oyonnax 
 Ioane Iashaghashvili to  Valence Romans
 Mat Luamanu to  Dax 
 Luka Tchelidze to  Biarritz (season-long loan)
 Martín Bogado to  Highlanders 
 Afa Amosa to  Agen

Bordeaux

Players In
 Ugo Boniface from  Bayonne 
 Antoine Miquel from  Toulouse 
 Zack Holmes from  Toulouse
 Sipili Falatea from  Clermont 
 Tani Vili from  Clermont
 Madosh Tambwe from  Bulls
 Caleb Timu unattached 
 Renato Giammarioli from  Worcester Warriors 
 Tom Willis from  Wasps

Players Out
 Louis Picamoles retired 
 UJ Seuteni to  La Rochelle 
 Ben Lam to  Montpellier 
 Vadim Cobîlaș retired 
 Alexandre Roumat to  Toulouse 
 François Trinh-Duc retired 
 Thierry Paiva to  La Rochelle
 Julien Brosse to  Massy
 Enzo Baggiani to  Vannes 
 Connor Sa to  Carcassonne (season-long loan)
 Joseph Dweba to  Stormers
 Cameron Woki to  Racing 92 
 Nathanaël Hulleu to  Vannes (season-long loan)
 Lasha Tabidze to  Biarritz

Brive

Players In
 Sammy Arnold from  Connacht 
 Malino Vanai from  Agen
 Rodrigo Bruni from  Vannes 
 Abraham Papali'i from  Connacht
 Lucas Da Silva from  Stade Français
 Marcel van der Merwe from  London Irish
 Julien Delannoy from  Pau
 Mesu Kunavula from  Edinburgh
 Tietie Tuimauga from  Wellington 
 Arthur Bonneval from  Toulouse

Players Out
 Peniami Narisia to  Racing 92 
 Kitione Kamikamica to  Racing 92 
 Simon-Pierre Chauvac to  Montpellier 
 Thomas Acquier to  Bayonne
 Victor Lebas to  Oyonnax
 Soso Bekoshvili to  Carcassonne 
 Cody Thomas to  Rouen 
 Sevanaia Galala to  Montauban
 Tedo Abzhandadze to  Montauban
 Dylan Lam to  Massy
 Otar Giorgadze to  Montauban
 So'otala Fa'aso'o to  London Irish 
 Steevy Cerqueira to  Chambéry 
 Pierre Tournebidze to  Perigueux
 Enzo Jouannet to  Floriac 
 Mitch Lees retired
 Malino Vanai to  Montauban 
 Hayden Thompson-Stringer to  La Rochelle

Castres

Players In
 Aurelien Azar from  Carcassonne 
 Gauthier Maravat from  Agen 
 Adrien Seguret from  Grenoble
 Asier Usarraga from  Bayonne
 Gauthier Doubrere from  Mont-de-Marsan
 Leone Nakarawa from  Toulon 
 Julien Blanc from  Toulon

Players Out
 Rory Kockott retired
 Clement Clavieres to  Carcassonne 
 Pierre Aguillon to  Carcassonne 
 Jack Whetton to  Colomiers 
 Stephane Onambele to  Carcassonne
 Bastien Guillemin to  Montauban
 Julius Nostadt to  Provence
 Mateaki Kafatolu to  Bayonne
 Hugo Hermet to  Oyonnax
 Loïc Jacquet retired

Clermont

Players In
 Anthony Belleau from  Toulon 
 Jules Plisson from  La Rochelle
 Loic Godener from  Stade Français 
 Irae Simone from  Brumbies 
 Bautista Delguy from  Perpignan 
 Julien Hériteau from  Toulon
 Alex Newsome from  NSW Waratahs
 Davit Kubriashvili from  Perpignan

Players Out
 Morgan Parra to  Stade Français 
 Sipili Falatea to  Bordeaux
 Tani Vili to  Bordeaux
 Bastien Pourailly to  Bayonne
 Camille Lopez to  Bayonne
 JJ Hanrahan to  Dragons
 Henzo Kiteau to  Aurillac (season-long loan) 
 Juan Martin Scelzo to  Stade Français
 Clement Lanen to  Massy
 Kotaro Matsushima to  Tokyo Sungoliath 
 Wesley Fofana retired 
 Alexandre Lapandry retired

La Rochelle

Players In
 Antoine Hastoy from  Pau 
 Quentin Lespiaucq from  Pau 
 UJ Seuteni from  Bordeaux
 Thierry Paiva from  Bordeaux
 Teddy Thomas from  Racing 92 
 Georges-Henri Colombe from  Racing 92 
 Yoan Tanga from  Racing 92
 Ultan Dillane from  Connacht
 Kyle Hatherell from  Worcester Warriors 
 Hayden Thompson-Stringer from  Brive

Players Out
 Ihaia West to  Toulon 
 Jules Plisson to  Clermont
 Arthur Retière to  Toulouse
 Mathieu Tanguy to  Toulon
 Wiaan Liebenberg retired
 Dany Priso to  Toulon
 Victor Vito retired 
 Jérémy Sinzelle to  Toulon
 Guram Papidze to  Pau
 Facundo Bosch to  Bayonne 
 Kavekini Tabu to  Bourg-en-Bresse
 Eneriko Buliruarua to  Bayonne
 Michel Himmer to  Soyaux Angoulême
 Ramiro Herrera to  Hindú

Lyon

Players In
 Paulo Tafili from  Toulouse
 Josiah Maraku from  Narbonne 
 Maxime Gouzou from  Mont-de-Marsan 
 Liam Coltman from  Highlanders 
 Kyle Godwin from  Western Force
 Arno Botha from  Bulls
 Fletcher Smith from  Green Rockets Tokatsu
 Feao Fotuaika from  Queensland Reds

Players Out
 Mickaël Ivaldi to  Stade Français 
 Pierre-Louis Barassi to  Toulouse
 Clement Laporte to  Pau
 Charlie Ngatai to  Leinster
 Colby Fainga'a to  Kyuden Voltex
 Mathieu Bastareaud to  Toulon

Montpellier

Players In
 Ben Lam from  Bordeaux
 Simon-Pierre Chauvac from  Brive
 Léo Coly from  Mont-de-Marsan 
 Louis Carbonel from  Toulon
 Clement Doumenc from  Carcassonne 
 Karl Tu'inukuafe from  Blues
 Giovanni Sante from  Mogliano
 Alex Masibaka from  Western Force 
 George Bridge from  Crusaders  
 Curtis Langdon from  Worcester Warriors

Players Out
 Guilhem Guirado retired 
 Handré Pollard to  Leicester Tigers 
 Mikheil Nariashvili to  Bayonne 
 Fulgence Ouedraogo retired 
 Robert Rodgers to  Aurillac (season-long loan) 
 Benoît Paillaugue to  Toulon 
 Malik Hamadache to  Agen 
 Kélian Galletier to  Perpignan
 Yannick Arroyo to  Béziers (season-long loan)
 Martin Doan to  Mont-de-Marsan 
 Mickaël Capelli to  Pau
 Yvan Reilhac to  Pau (season-long loan)

Pau

Players In
 Sacha Zegueur from  Oyonnax 
 Emilien Gailleton from  Agen
 Clement Laporte from  Lyon
 Guram Papidze from  La Rochelle
 Romain Ruffenach from  Biarritz 
 Mickaël Capelli from  Montpellier
 Yvan Reilhac from  Montpellier (season-long loan)
 Dan Robson from  Wasps 
 Santiago Grondona from  Exeter Chiefs

Players Out
 Giovanni Habel-Kuffner to  Stade Français 
 Antoine Hastoy to  La Rochelle
 Quentin Lespiaucq to  La Rochelle
 Daniel Ramsay retired 
 Kevin Yameogo to  Montauban (season-long loan) 
 Marco Zanon to  Benetton
 Julien Delannoy to  Brive
 Louis Barrere to  Dax
 Rayne Barka to  Soyaux Angoulême (season-long loan)

Perpignan

Players In
 Jake McIntyre from  Western Force 
 Victor Moreaux from  Racing 92
 Kélian Galletier from  Montpellier
 Boris Goutard from  Narbonne 
 Maʻafu Fia from  Ospreys
 Dorian Laborde from  Toulon 
 Will Witty from  Exeter Chiefs
 Brad Shields from  Wasps 
 Ali Crossdale from  Wasps

Players Out
 Melvyn Jaminet to  Toulouse
 Jean-Bernard Pujol to  Montauban
 Julien Farnoux to  Grenoble 
 Damien Chouly retired 
 Bautista Delguy to  Clermont
 Dylan Jaminet to  Nevers 
 Nafi Ma'afu to  Biarritz
 Killian Taofifenua to  Biarritz
 Tevita Cavubati retired
 Sami Mavinga to  Carcassonne
 Henry Tuilagi to  Cognac Saint-Jean-d'Angély 
 Guillem Montagne to  Narbonne 
 Davit Kubriashvili to  Clermont 
 Brayden Wiliame to  New Zealand Warriors

Racing 92

Players In
 Janick Tarrit from  Nevers 
 Peniami Narisia from  Brive
 Kitione Kamikamica from  Brive
 Asaeli Tuivuaka from  Zebre Parma
 Warrick Gelant from  Stormers
 Veikoso Poloniati from  Moana Pasifika
 Cameron Woki from  Bordeaux
 Regan Grace from  St Helens
 Christian Wade unattached 
 Francis Saili from  Biarritz 
 Biyi Alo from  Wasps 
 Vinaya Habosi from  Fijian Drua

Players Out
 Georges-Henri Colombe to  La Rochelle
 Teddy Thomas to  La Rochelle
 Yoan Tanga to  La Rochelle
 Teddy Baubigny to  Toulon 
 Maxime Machenaud to  Bayonne
 Victor Moreaux to  Perpignan
 Jean Chezeau to  Vannes (season-long loan) 
 Kevin Le Guen to  Soyaux Angoulême
 Luka Begic to  Chambéry 
 Mitch Short to  Béziers
 Baptiste Pesenti to  Stade Français
 Luke Jones to  Queensland Reds 
 Virimi Vakatawa retired

Stade Français

Players In
 Giovanni Habel-Kuffner from  Pau
 Morgan Parra from  Clermont
 Mickaël Ivaldi from  Lyon
 Stephane Ahmed from  Montauban
 Mathieu Hirigoyen from  Biarritz
 Lucas Peyresblanques from  Biarritz
 Giorgi Tsutskiridze from  Aurillac 
 Hugo N'Diaye from  Rouen 
 Julien Ory from  Toulon
 Juan Martin Scelzo from  Clermont
 Baptiste Pesenti from  Racing 92 
 Theo Dachary from  Toulon
 Louis Druart from  Montauban 
 Nadir Megdoud from  Rouen 
 Jeremy Ward from  Sharks 
 Peniasi Dakuwaqa from  Fiji Sevens 
 Vincent Koch from  Wasps 
 Paolo Odogwu from  Wasps
 Sitaleki Timani from  Toulon

Players Out
 Waisea Nayacalevu to  Toulon
 Charlie Francoz to  Biarritz
 Quentin Bethune to  Bayonne
 Lucas Da Silva to  Brive
 Tala Gray to  Grenoble
 Loic Godener to  Clermont
 Adrien Lapegue to  Provence 
 William Percillier to  Vannes (season-long loan) 
 Antoine Burban retired
 Adrien Lapegue to  Provence
 Tolu Latu to  NSW Waratahs 
 Yoann Maestri to  Toyota Industries Shuttles Aichi 
 Ngani Laumape to  Kobelco Kobe Steelers

Toulon

Players In
 Ihaia West from  La Rochelle
 Teddy Baubigny from  Racing 92
 Waisea Nayacalevu from  Stade Français
 Mathieu Tanguy from  La Rochelle
 Dany Priso from  La Rochelle 
 Maёlan Rabut from  Vannes 
 Jérémy Sinzelle from  La Rochelle
 Benoît Paillaugue from  Montpellier
 Sitaleki Timani unattached 
 Mathieu Bastareaud from  Lyon
 Dan Biggar from  Northampton Saints

Players Out
 Anthony Belleau to  Clermont
 Louis Carbonel to  Montpellier
 Sonatane Takulua to  Agen 
 Eben Etzebeth to  Sharks
 Lopeti Timani to  Cardiff 
 Mike Sosene-Feagai to  Agen 
 Julien Ory to  Stade Français 
 Julien Hériteau to  Clermont
 Petero Tuwai to  Suresnes
 Fabio Gonzalez to  Chambéry (season-long loan)
 Theo Dachary to  Stade Français
 Dorian Laborde to  Perpignan
 Leone Nakarawa to  Castres
 Harrison Obatoyinbo to  Mont-de-Marsan 
 Quinn Roux to  Bath 
 Julien Blanc to  Castres 
 Sitaleki Timani to  Stade Français

Toulouse

Players In
 Alexandre Roumat from  Bordeaux
 Arthur Retière from  La Rochelle
 Melvyn Jaminet from  Perpignan
 Pierre-Louis Barassi from  Lyon
 Paul Graou from  Agen 
 Ange Capuozzo from  Grenoble
 Jack Willis from  Wasps

Players Out
 Antoine Miquel to  Bordeaux
 Zack Holmes to  Bordeaux
 Joe Tekori retired 
 Paulo Tafili to  Lyon
 Maxime Medard retired
 Romain Riguet to  Montauban (season-long loan)
 Paul Arnaud Ausset to  Dax 
 Baptiste Germain to  Biarritz (season-long loan)
 Alexi Balès retired 
 Arthur Bonneval to  Brive

See also
List of 2022–23 Premiership Rugby transfers
List of 2022–23 United Rugby Championship transfers
List of 2022–23 Super Rugby transfers
List of 2022–23 RFU Championship transfers
List of 2022–23 Rugby Pro D2 transfers
List of 2022–23 Major League Rugby transfers

References

2020-21
2022–23 Top 14 season